Rungu may refer to:

 Rungu (Borneo ethnic group), of Borneo in the South China Sea
 Rungu (African ethnic group), of Zambia and Tanzania in Africa
Rungu (weapon), a traditional throwing stick or cudgel of East Africa